Noel's House Party is a BBC light entertainment series that was hosted by Noel Edmonds. Set in a large house in the fictional village of Crinkley Bottom, leading to much innuendo, it ran from 23 November 1991 to 20 March 1999 on BBC One, and for 8 series was broadcast live on Saturday evenings. The show, once described by a senior corporation executive as "the most important show on the BBC", was cancelled in February 1999 due to declining ratings, although two further compilation specials were shown in March 2000. In 2010, Noel's House Party was voted the best Saturday night TV show of all time. In August 2022, an episode of the show, the tenth episode of the first series (originally broadcast on 1 February 1992), was repeated on BBC Four. This marks the first time since 2000 that the show has been broadcast on the BBC.

History
Noel's House Party was the successor to The Noel Edmonds Saturday Roadshow, carrying over some of its regular features such as the 'Gunge Tank', the 'Gotcha Oscar' and 'Wait Till I Get You Home'.

The show had many celebrity guests posing as residents of Crinkley Bottom, including Frank Thornton and Vicki Michelle. It gave birth to Mr. Blobby in the Gotcha segment. There was also a contrived rivalry between Edmonds and Tony Blackburn. One-off celebrity appearances included Michael Crawford as Frank Spencer, who came in to find the whole audience dressed as Frank after Troon comedian Stuart Henderson had performed as Frank singing The Beatles' "I Saw Her Standing There" and Ken Dodd in a highwayman's outfit—"going cheap at the Maxwell sale"—as Noel's long-lost 'twin', Berasent Edmonds (a play on Bury St Edmunds).

After several changes, the show began to decline in popularity.
Its theme tune was changed in 1996, and set redesigns followed.
The episode due to be broadcast on 3 January 1998 had to be cancelled after a disagreement between Edmonds and the BBC.
The budget had been cut by 10%, with the money saved being used to help fund the BBC digital switchover.
Edmonds reportedly walked out, claiming the show was "of a poor standard and cobbled together".

The BBC cancelled the show in February 1999 after ratings plummeted from a high of 15 million to 8 million. Edmonds closed the final episode of House Party on 20 March 1999 by saying:

He was then playfully attacked with a fire extinguisher by Freddie Starr. The closing credits were followed by a brief comic skit of Edmonds' 1970s children's show Multi-Coloured Swap Shop, in which a seemingly young Noel wakes from a dream in the Swap Shop studio - recounting the events to Keith Chegwin and John Craven of a typical House Party episode (reminiscent of the infamous Bobby Ewing "shower scene" in Dallas) suggesting that the entire run of House Party never really happened.

In a statement, Edmonds said: 

He partly blamed the Ronan Keating talent show Get Your Act Together for poor ratings leading into House Party.

Awards
In 1993, Noel's House Party won a BAFTA for best light entertainment series.

In 1994, the opening titles won a Bronze Rose of Montreux.  The stop-motion animation title and credit sequences were made by 3 Peach Animation.

Regular features

Gotcha
Originally called the 'Gotcha Oscars' until the threat of legal action from the Academy of Motion Picture Arts and Sciences (which also prompted a redesign of the award), where hidden camera practical jokes were played on celebrities (these were pre-recorded during the months the show was off air). Notable victims were Barbara Windsor, Carol Vorderman, Jill Dando, Kriss Akabusi, Lionel Blair, Dave Lee Travis, Richard Whiteley, Eddie Large, Samantha Janus, Yvette Fielding, Status Quo, and the Queens Park Rangers football club. In the final episode of series 5, Dale Winton turned the tables on Edmonds with a surprise challenge that ended with a gunging. Another notable victim was Annabel Giles, the first victim who managed to spot the hidden camera, which had been placed in the back of a car, which meant the prank backfired. This feature originated in The Noel Edmonds Saturday Roadshow.

Wait Till I Get You Home
Parents watch pre-recorded clips of their children being interviewed by Edmonds, and try to guess the children's answers. In Series 5 it was replaced with Wait Till We All Get Home, but was then axed for series 6 and not replaced. It did however make a one-off return in the final episode. This complete segment was pre-recorded some months before each series of the show began, and originated in The Noel Edmonds Saturday Roadshow.

The Lyric Game
In series 1, celebrity duos competed against one another to complete the lyrics of a song after being given the first line. This feature was originally in The Noel Edmonds Saturday Roadshow. In series 2 members of the public had to guess the name of the song from the lyrics, but this was replaced in series 3 with the panel game.

Grab a Grand
A phone-in competition where a viewer chose from three currencies (aiming to select the greatest value of money; £1,000 in the first 2 episodes), and a celebrity (usually a sports star like Graham Gooch, Frank Bruno, Kathy Tayler, Kriss Akabusi, Nick Gillingham, Henry Cooper, Stephen Hendry, Steve Davis, David Gower, Gary Lineker, John Regis, Paul Gascoigne, John Barnes, Lennox Lewis, and others) would climb into a perspex box containing a fan and a large quantity of banknotes selected by the call-in contestant. The celebrity had to grab as many of the notes as possible as they were blown around by the fan.

Before the game starts, a chosen player is picked from the call in contestants who got a question correct during the show or from a previous weeks show to be picked, there would be three different bundles of money, usually two known countries and one bundle known as the "Crinkley Bottom Groats" which was pegged to a generally random country, all valued within £1,000, sometimes more or sometimes less. Noel would ask the caller three questions based on that week's news. Each correct answer gave the celebrity 20 seconds in the box (up to a total of 60 seconds) accompanied by music and the audience counting down from ten to one.

The format was changed slightly in series 4, in which the caller could choose a member of the studio audience to do the "grand grabbing" (the audience member would win the same amount of money the caller won). During Season 4, Grab a Grand had a few quirks added in, including some modified moments: balloons inside the box, the walls falling down, allowing audience members to help, the door jammed, cheating, the machine broken, being flipped for Number Cruncher and inside a woman's house when NTV happened.

Then, in the first episode of series 5, the box was blown up live during the show and the segment was revamped with the entire studio audience now playing grabbing notes that were being blown around by two large industrial fans as the celebrity would run into to collect, rather than having the three currencies, instead it featured the groats as the main currency, mixed within the groats would be "Golden Groats" worth £50 each if collected. 

There was also an incident when one of the callers had the same name, but it turned out it was not the person who had called in: the real call-in contestant had their Grab a Grand game at the start of the next episode, as this one featured the grab a grand around the grand house track. Towards the end of series 5, variations were introduced: 'Grab a Granny', 'Grab a Grand Piano', and 'Grab a Grand National' etc. The money was quickly counted on stage using a Cashmaster counting machine. The last Grab a Grand was done on the last episode of series 5 (coincidentally, the 100th episode).

Grab a Grand was then replaced with Cash for Questions in Series 6.

NTV
A camera was hidden in the home of a member of the public and Edmonds would talk to them through their television. Some would be shocked, other bemused, others would simply try to run away. Whatever the reaction, they would subsequently end up doing some embarrassing performance in their living room or garden. Celebrity victims included Chris Evans, Garry Bushell and Dale Winton.

The Gunge Tank
Carried over from The Noel Edmonds Saturday Roadshow, the gunge tank was put to various uses, usually gunging celebrities or unpopular members of the public after a phone vote was carried out during the show. Gunging usually took place in the final minutes of the show.

The 'gunge' was a food-thickening agent called Natrosol, coloured with various food dyes. The gunge tank got progressively more sophisticated. From Series One a standard tank was used, with an ornate look to it. Series Two introduced foam (often coloured) rising up from the bottom prior to the gunging. Series 3 introduced the 'Car Wash', where the individual was carried along a lengthier tank, going through a set of brushes designed to soak the victim, then having the gunge descend from above before being spun out of the contraption. In series Four and Five, it was developed into the 'Trip Around The Great House', where the victim was placed on a miniature railway that took them on a journey around the set, finishing up in the giant fireplace, where gunge was finally released onto the victim. From Series Six, there were changes to the format, and gunge was used less frequently. For Series Eight, a member of the audience would be gunged by a tank lowered from the studio rafters, or their chair would be lowered into the undercroft of the seating area, where they were gunged, and came back up again.

Edmonds himself often got gunged, usually in the last episode of a series.

The Big Pork Pie
The Big Pork Pie was a regular feature from Series Three where a member of the audience with an embarrassing secret was sat in a big pork pie, made to wear a lie detector and questioned by Noel. Noel himself was subjected to this torture on one episode, with Bob Monkhouse taking on the role of question master and as a result it turned out that Noel's middle name was Ernest.

Number Cruncher
A regular feature for Series Four and Series Five, where a phone box modified to contain a gunge tank and a TV screen was placed somewhere in Britain. The code to get into the phone box was broadcast live on air, and the first viewer to reach the phone box got to play a game. Once inside, they had 45 seconds to rearrange a code on the screen to win a prize and get out again. If they ran out of time, they were covered in gunge. If they solved the puzzle, they had an opportunity to gamble their prize. By pulling a handle, they could either double their money, have random objects dropped on them, or be covered in gunge.

Beat Your Neighbour
One of the main features on Series Five, in which two neighbours would run round to each other's house and, in one minute, grab as many belongings as they wanted. Then, following a series of alternate questions, one neighbour would win everything, including their own stuff back.

Hot House 
A pair of Top athletes were pitted against each other in a fitness test throughout series 6.

Cash for Questions
For Series Six only, similar to Grab a Grand.

The first part of the game would be a qualifying question or clue this would be supplied by the professor (Portrayed by Brian Blessed). The professor is given a probe camera and sticks it into random objects (ie a loofah). The second part features a Wheel of Fortune being spun. A person from the audience is strapped horizontally to a wheel (normally someone committing an embarrassing thing). The wheel stops spinning and points to one of eight section and phones. The person on the other end of that phone has to get a question correct. If they get it wrong, the wheel is re-spun. However, if they get it correct then they are given a further three current affairs questions. Each correct answer is worth twenty seconds for B-list celeb to go crazy in the Basement.

In the third part, The Basement is pitch black and the caller, with infra-red camera at their disposal, tries to guide the person through the basement collecting bags of money along the way. Each one was worth £100, with golden ones worth £500. At the end of the time the lights came on, so there was nothing stopping the celebrity grabbing an extra bag or two on the way out. Named after a political scandal.

My Little Friend
My Little Friend was a pre-recorded feature used from Series Six to Series Eight. This involved small school children being faced with puppets that start talking to them (one voiced by Noel and another by Barry Killerby). In series 7 it was aliens, while in the final series, Phibber the frog and Waffle the Squirrel spoke to the children, and sometimes scared them away.

The Secret World of the Teenager
For series 7, a teenage version of Wait Till I Get You Home. This segment was pre-recorded.

Soap
In series 7.  Crinkley Bottom: The Soap - a short-lived pre-recorded soap opera chronicling village life.

Panel Beaters
A celebrity panel game from the second half of Series Seven, in which celebrities had to spot the imposter from three members of the public with apparently bizarre occupations. If they failed, they got gunged.

Sofa Soccer
In the final series, a similar idea to Bernie the Bolt in The Golden Shot, a viewer at home would attempt to score goals by directing a machine to fire a huge football. The commands were 'left', 'right' and 'shoot'. Each goal was worth £400, a maximum of £2,000 could be won if five goals were scored. The music used for this game was based on Crazy Horses by The Osmonds.

Three to Go
A game from towards the end of Series Eight. Noel would link up with three regional news programmes, who would each bring an improbable-sounding news story from their region. The contestants would have to guess whether the stories were true or false.

Mr Blobby

In 1992, during series two of House Party, the character Mr Blobby was introduced as a way for Noel Edmonds to play practical jokes on celebrities. The success of the character resulted in a large amount of merchandise, public appearances and even theme parks based around the character. Mr Blobby was portrayed by Barry Killerby, except for a performance in November 1994, when, due to illness, Mr Blobby was portrayed by Kevin Hall, a performer from the Crinkley Bottom theme park in Morecambe.

Mr Blobby was dropped from the show after series 7, but made a surprise reappearance in the final ever episode. During that episode, he ordered Edmonds to confess that dropping him from the show was a mistake, telling Edmonds to say "I wouldn't be in this mess if I hadn't sacked him."

Crinkley Bottom Theme Parks

With the House Party set in the fictional village of Crinkley Bottom, Edmonds opened three Crinkley Bottom attractions at pre-existing theme parks in the UK. The first, based at Cricket St Thomas in Somerset, featured many Mr Blobby attractions and was due to include a replica of the Great House from the series. The park closed in 1998 following dwindling attendance figures.

In 1994, a Crinkley Bottom theme park opened in Morecambe. It closed 13 weeks after opening. A two-year investigation by the district auditor was started due to the investment of £2 million by Lancaster City Council. It resulted in both the Conservatives and Liberal Democrats withdrawing from the cabinet, leaving four councillors from Morecambe Bay Independents and the Green Party running the authority. A third Crinkley Bottom theme park was based at Pleasurewood Hills in Lowestoft, but has since closed.

Transmissions

Series

* Originally to run for 21 episodes. The show scheduled for 6 March 1993 was cancelled due to an IRA bomb scare at BBC Television Centre, instead showing a repeat of the 1991 edition of Noel's Christmas Presents and Tom and Jerry's 1944 cartoon, "The Zoot Cat".

† Originally to run for 22 episodes. The show scheduled for 3 January 1998 was cancelled due to a disagreement between Edmonds and the BBC, a repeat of The Best of Noel's House Party, originally broadcast on 11 October 1997, was shown instead.

Specials

International versions and airings

The re-runs of Noel's House Party was also aired on Channel 9 in Australia and on Network 2 in New Zealand throughout the 90s.

References

External links

Noel's House Party at the BFI

1991 British television series debuts
2000 British television series endings
BBC Television shows
English-language television shows
Television series featuring gunge